Allen George Schwartz (August 23, 1934 – March 22, 2003) was a United States district judge of the United States District Court for the Southern District of New York.

Education and career
Born in Brooklyn, New York, Schwartz received a Bachelor of Business Administration degree from City College of New York, Baruch College in 1955 and a Bachelor of Laws from the University of Pennsylvania Law School in 1958. He was in the United States Army from 1958 to 1959, remaining in the United States Army Reserves until 1965. He was an Assistant district attorney of New York County from 1959 to 1962. He was in private practice in New York City from 1962 to 1977, and a corporation counsel for New York City from 1978 to 1981, returning to private practice from 1982 to 1993. 

Schwartz was defense counsel for comedian Lenny Bruce, who was arrested in 1964 and charged with obscenity in connection with his standup routine at Cafe Au Go Go, a Greenwich Village nightclub. 

He formed a law partnership with Edward I. Koch in 1965. Appointed Corporation Counsel when Koch became New York City mayor in 1978, Schwartz was credited with revamping the corporation counsel office, which was in disarray as a result of the city's fiscal crisis. Beyond his professional relationships, Schwartz was a close friend and adviser to Koch. Schwartz later said, "Ed Koch and I never had an argument and we never had an uncomfortable day with each other." 

Schwartz presided over a legal dispute between authors J. K. Rowling and N. K. Stouffer. Stouffer alleged that Rowling had stolen material from her 1984 works The Legend of Rah and the Muggles and Larry Potter and His Best Friend Lilly. In 2002 Schwartz ruled that Stouffer had lied to the court and doctored evidence to support her claims, fining Stouffer $50,000 for a "pattern of intentional bad faith conduct."

Federal judicial service
On October 27, 1993, Schwartz was nominated by President Bill Clinton to a seat on the United States District Court for the Southern District of New York vacated by Vincent Lyons Broderick. Schwartz was confirmed by the United States Senate on November 20, 1993, and received his commission on November 22, 1993, serving until his death at age 68.

See also
List of Jewish American jurists

References

Sources

1934 births
2003 deaths
20th-century American judges
20th-century American lawyers
21st-century American judges
City College of New York alumni
Judges of the United States District Court for the Southern District of New York
Lawyers from Brooklyn
United States Army personnel
United States district court judges appointed by Bill Clinton
University of Pennsylvania Law School alumni
United States Army reservists